The Unquiet Englishman: A Life of Graham Greene is a 2021 book by Richard Greene that examines Graham Greene. The book has seven "positive" reviews, five "rave" reviews, and six "mixed" reviews, according to review aggregator Book Marks.

References

2021 non-fiction books
English-language books
W. W. Norton & Company books
British biographies
Graham Greene